Belton Standpipe may refer to:

Belton Standpipe (Belton, South Carolina), listed on the National Register of Historic Places in Anderson County, South Carolina
Belton Standpipe (Belton, Texas), listed on the National Register of Historic Places in Bell County, Texas